Route 143 is a north/south highway on the south shore of the Saint Lawrence River. Until the mid-1970s when the province decided to renumber all highways other than autoroutes, it was known as Route/Highway 5. Its northern terminus is in Saint-François-du-Lac, at the junction of Route 132, and the southern terminus is in Stanstead, at the border with Vermont where the road continues past the Derby Line–Stanstead Border Crossing as U.S. Route 5 through Derby Line to New Haven, Connecticut.

Since Autoroute 55 closely parallels Route 143 for most of its length, much commercial traffic chooses the former. However, it is a very busy route and takes much traffic from the border to the Sherbrooke local area. Route 143 closely follows the Saint-François River between Sherbrooke and Ulverton.

The road is often in notoriously poor condition, since its original cement was laid directly on a gravel road in the mid-1920s. It has been extensively resurfaced to the point the pavement is now more than three feet thick in places, but it heaves extensively at every spring thaw.

Municipalities along Route 143

 Stanstead
 Stanstead-Est
 Hatley
 Waterville
 Sherbrooke - (Lennoxville / Sherbrooke / Bromptonville)
 Val-Joli
 Windsor
 Cleveland
 Richmond
 Ulverton
 L'Avenir
 Drummondville - (Saint-Nicéphore / Drummondville / Saint-Majorique-de-Grantham)
 Saint-Bonaventure
 Saint-Pie-de-Guire
 Saint-François-du-Lac

Major intersections

See also

 List of Quebec provincial highways

References

External links 
 Interactive Provincial Route Map (Transports Québec) 
 Route 143 on Google Maps

143
Transport in Drummondville
Transport in Sherbrooke